The Faculty of Law, Cambridge is the law school of the University of Cambridge.

The study of law at the University of Cambridge began in the thirteenth century. The faculty sits the oldest law professorship in the English-speaking world, the Regius Professorship of Civil Law, which was founded by Henry VIII in 1540 with a stipend of £40 per year for which the holder is still chosen by The Crown. Today, the faculty incorporates the Institute of Criminology as well as 11 Research Centres, including the world's leading research institute for international law, The Lauterpacht Centre for International Law. The faculty has 31 professors, six readers, and over 70 other university, faculty and college teaching officers. The student body comprises about 700 undergraduate and 250 postgraduate students. It is also home to the Cambridge University Law Society, the largest student-run law society in the United Kingdom and among the largest in the world.

Courses offered 
The BA Tripos undergraduate degree at Cambridge is intended to give a thorough grounding in the principles of law viewed from an academic rather than a vocational perspective. The faculty offers the following postgraduate degrees: the LLM, the MCL, the MLitt, the MPhil in Criminology, the MPhil in Criminological Research, the M.St in Applied Criminology, Penology and Management, the M.St in Applied Criminology and Police Management, the PhD in Criminology, and the PhD in Law. In addition, the faculty offers the Postgraduate Diploma in Legal Studies and the Postgraduate Diploma in International Law.

Rankings and reputation 
Cambridge is unanimously ranked as the best law school in the UK by all major national academic league tables. It is currently ranked first by The Guardian, The Times/The Sunday Times' Good University Guide, and The Complete University Guide. Since it started publishing its annual rankings for 2010, The Guardian has ranked Cambridge first six times (2010, 2012, 2015, 2016, 2017, and 2018). The Complete University Guide has given the top spot to Cambridge since 2013 and eight times in the last 11 years. The Times Good University Guide law rankings has Cambridge atop its league table since 2014.

In 2021, THE ranked Cambridge as the world's second best university for law in its 2021 subject rankings. In 2021, the QS World University Rankings ranked Cambridge as the world's third best university for law and legal studies.

Facilities

David Williams Building

The faculty is housed in the David Williams Building on the university's Sidgwick Site in Cambridge. The Building is named after the University's first full-time Vice-Chancellor and Professor of Public Law, Professor Sir David Williams. The Building opened in 1996 and was designed by Lord Norman Foster of Thames Bank, who also designed the terminal building at Stansted Airport and 30 St Mary Axe (the "Gherkin" in London). The building suffered serious acoustic problems (primarily due to a lack of consideration of acoustics in Foster's design), with its form amplifying any noise from the lower levels and causing significant disturbance at higher levels, not least in the library. This was fixed in 1999 with the installation of a glazed acoustic screen, separating quiet areas from noisy ones.

The David Williams Building contains the University's Squire Law Library, together with offices, lecture and seminar rooms and common room facilities.

Squire Law Library 

The Squire Law Library, which occupies the majority of the first, second and third floors of the building, is a dependent library of Cambridge University Library. It contains one of the three largest legal collections in the UK with more than 180,000 volumes. The collection is very strong across UK law, the law of other major common law countries (the United States, Australia, Canada and New Zealand), international law and the law of the European Union, France and Germany. There are, additionally, smaller collections for the law of many other countries. The library provides its users with access to many major legal databases.

The library was founded in 1904, at first with only 8,000 volumes, although this soon increased. In 1934, together with the Seeley Historical Library, it moved to the Cockerell Building on Senate House Passage, previously the home of the University Library built in 1837-42. The Squire took over the whole of the Cockerell Building on the construction of James Stirling's building for the history library in 1968.  With the Squire's own move in turn, its former site became the library of Gonville and Caius College.

Most individual colleges also have a smaller law library of their own, while the Lauterpacht Centre for International Law has its own library composed of international law books and other related materials.

Societies 
There are a number of groups and societies based around the Faculty of Law:
 Cambridge University Law Society
 Cambridge Societies at the Inns of Court (Gray's Inn, Lincoln's Inn, and Middle Temple)
 Graduate Law Society
 The Cambridge University Society for Women Lawyers
 Cambridge University Students' Pro Bono Society
 Cambridge Pro Bono Project
Most colleges also have their own law societies.

Publications 
Notable publications produced under the aegis of the faculty include:
  University of Cambridge Faculty of Law Legal Studies Research Paper Series 
 The Cambridge Law Journal
 International Law Reports
 Clarendon Studies in Criminology (joint venture with the criminology centres at Oxford and the London School of Economics)
 Cambridge Studies in English Legal History
 Cambridge International Law Journal

Notable persons

Alumni

Faculty 
Named Chairs
 Downing Professor of the Laws of England (Lionel Smith since 2022)
 Regius Professor of Civil Law (Helen Scott since 2022)
 Rouse Ball Professor of English Law (Louise Gullifer since 2019)
 Whewell Professor of International Law (Eyal Benvenisti since 2016)
 Sir David Williams Professor of Public Law (Alison Young since January 2018)
 S.J. Berwin Professor of Corporate Law (Brian Cheffins since 1998)
 Harold Samuel Professor of Law and Environmental Policy (Jorge E Viñuales since 2013)

Others
 Trevor Allan, Professor of Jurisprudence and Public Law
 Catherine Barnard, Professor of European Union and Labour Law since 2008
 Eilís Ferran, Professor of Company and Securities Law since 2005
 Matthew Kramer, Professor of Legal and Political Philosophy 
 Graham Virgo, Professor of English Private Law since 2007
 Richard Fentiman, Professor of Private International Law

References

External links
 
 Squire Law Library
 University of Cambridge

Foster and Partners buildings
High-tech architecture
Lattice shell structures
Law, Faculty of
Law schools in England